This was the first edition of the tournament.

Sofia Kenin won the title after defeating Nicole Gibbs 6–0, 6–4 in the final.

Seeds

Draw

Finals

Top half

Bottom half

References
Main Draw

Berkeley Tennis Club Challenge - Singles